Tell Me What You Saw is a 2020 South Korean television series starring Jang Hyuk, Choi Soo-young, and Jin Seo-yeon. It aired on OCN from February 1 to March 22, 2020.

Synopsis
Oh Hyun-jae (Jang Hyuk) was a genius profiler who cracked many cold cases using his unsurpassed profiling skills. One day, his fiancée was killed in an explosion set by a serial killer and Hyun-jae lived in seclusion after that. Five years later, a new murder takes place using the same method as that serial killer. While investigating the case, team leader Hwang Ha-young (Jin Seo-yeon) meets a  detective from the countryside, Cha Soo-young (Choi Soo-young), who has a photographic memory. She introduced Soo-young to Hyun-jae and they work together to go after the serial killer.

Cast

Main
 Jang Hyuk as Oh Hyun-jae
 A genius criminal profiler who became a recluse after losing his fiancée in an explosion.
 Choi Soo-young as Cha Soo-young
 A rookie detective from the countryside with a photographic memory.

Supporting

People in Mucheon Metropolitan Police Agency
 Jin Seo-yeon as Hwang Ha-young
 The team leader of the Regional Investigation Unit (RIU).
Jang Hyun-sung as Choi Hyung-pil
 An ambitious senior superintendent of the Mucheon Metropolitan Police Agency.
 Ryu Seung-soo as Yang Man-soo
 A veteran detective in the Regional Investigation Unit (RIU).
 Shin Soo-ho as Jang Tae-sung
 A reckless detective in the RIU.
 Yoo Hee-je as Lee Ji-min
 A brainy detective in the RIU.

People around Oh Hyun-jae
 Lee Si-won as Han I-su
 Hyun-jae's fiancée who was a brilliant cellist.
 Lee Ki-hyuk as Won Se-yoon

People around Cha Soo-young
 Ha Sung-kwang as Cha Man-suk
 Soo-young's father who is a deaf-mute.
 Eum Moon-suk as Kang Dong-sik
 A countryside policeman who used to work as Soo-young's partner.

Original soundtrack

Part 1

Part 2

Part 3

Part 4

Part 5

Part 6

Ratings

Notes

References

External links
  
 
 

Korean-language television shows
2020 South Korean television series debuts
2020 South Korean television series endings
OCN television dramas
South Korean thriller television series
Television series by Studio Dragon